Qatar competed at the 2020 Summer Olympics in Tokyo. Originally scheduled to take place from 24 July to 9 August 2020, the Games were postponed to 23 July to 8 August 2021, because of the COVID-19 pandemic. It was the nation's tenth consecutive appearance at the Summer Olympics.

Fares El-Bakh became the first Qatari Olympic gold medallist.

One of the most memorable events in their second gold medal was Mutaz Essa Barshim who, alongside Italian high jump athlete Gianmarco Tamberi, shared the gold medal respectively, with a memorable quote of Mutaz asking the official "Can we have two golds?".

Medalists

Competitors
The following is the list of number of competitors in the Games.

Athletics
 
Qatari athletes achieved the entry standards, either by qualifying time or by world ranking, in the following track and field events (up to a maximum of 3 athletes in each event):

Track & road events

Field events

Judo
 
Qatar qualified one judoka for the men's half-lightweight category (66 kg) at the Games. Ayoub El-Idrissi accepted a continental berth from Asia as the nation's top-ranked judoka outside of direct qualifying position in the IJF World Ranking List of June 28, 2021.

Rowing

Qatar qualified one boat in the women's single sculls for the Games by finishing third in the B-final and securing the third of five berths available at the 2021 FISA Asia & Oceania Olympic Qualification Regatta in Tokyo, Japan. 

Qualification Legend: FA=Final A (medal); FB=Final B (non-medal); FC=Final C (non-medal); FD=Final D (non-medal); FE=Final E (non-medal); FF=Final F (non-medal); SA/B=Semifinals A/B; SC/D=Semifinals C/D; SE/F=Semifinals E/F; QF=Quarterfinals; R=Repechage

Shooting

Qatari shooters achieved quota places for the following events by virtue of their best finishes at the 2018 ISSF World Championships, the 2019 ISSF World Cup series, and Asian Championships, as long as they obtained a minimum qualifying score (MQS) by May 31, 2020.

Swimming

Qatar received a universality invitation from FINA to send two top-ranked swimmers (one per gender) to the Olympics, based on the FINA Points System of June 28, 2021.

Volleyball

Beach
Qatar men's beach volleyball pair qualified directly for the Olympics by virtue of their nation's top 15 placement in the FIVB Olympic Rankings of 13 June 2021.

Weightlifting

Qatar entered one weightlifter into the Olympic competition. Rio 2016 Olympian Fares Ibrahim topped the field of eight highest-ranked weightlifters in the men's 96 kg category based on the IWF Absolute World Rankings.

References

Nations at the 2020 Summer Olympics
2020
2020 in Qatari sport